Obongsan is a mountain of South Korea. It has an elevation of 1,136 metres

See also
List of mountains of Korea

References

Mountains of South Korea
Pyeongchang County
Hoengseong County
One-thousanders of South Korea